Julian Knowle and Jürgen Melzer were the defending champions, but Melzer chose not to participate this year.As a result, Knowle partnered with Andy Ram, but they lost to Robert Lindstedt and Horia Tecău in the semifinals. Lindstedt and Tecău went on to win the tournament, after defeating Rohan Bopanna and Aisam-ul-Haq Qureshi in the final 6–4, 7–5.

Seeds

Draw

External links
 Main Draw

Men's Doubles